Trechosiella is a genus of beetles in the family Carabidae, containing the following species:

 Trechosiella basilewskyi Jeannel, 1960
 Trechosiella katicola Jeannel, 1964
 Trechosiella laetula (Peringuey, 1899)
 Trechosiella macroptera Casale, 1986
 Trechosiella scotti (Jeannel, 1937)

References

Trechinae